Great Britain and Northern Ireland (often referred to as Great Britain) competed at the 2015 World Championships in Athletics in Beijing, China, from 22–30 August 2015. This was their most successful championships to date.

Medallists
The following British competitors won medals at the Championships

Results

Men
Track and road events

Field events

Women 
Track and road events

Field events
{|class=wikitable style="font-size:90%"
|-
!rowspan="2"|Athlete
!rowspan="2"|Event
!colspan="2"|Qualification
!colspan="2"|Final
|-style="font-size:95%"
!Distance
!Position
!Distance
!Position
|-style=text-align:center
|style=text-align:left| Morgan Lake
|style=text-align:left rowspan=2| High jump
|1.89
|14
|colspan=2
|-style=text-align:center
|style=text-align:left| Isobel Pooley
|1.89
|19
|colspan=2
|-style=text-align:center
|style=text-align:left| Katarina Johnson-Thompson
|style=text-align:left rowspan=3| Long jump
|6.79
|5 Q
|6.63
|11
|-style=text-align:center
|style=text-align:left| Shara Proctor
|6.68
|11 q
| 7.07 NR
| 
|-style=text-align:center
|style=text-align:left| Lorraine Ugen
|6.87
|2 Q
|6.85
| 5
|-style=text-align:center
|style=text-align:left| Holly Bradshaw
|style=text-align:left| Pole vault
|4.55 SB
|=1 q
|4.70 SB
|7
|-style=text-align:center
|style=text-align:left| Sophie Hitchon
|style=text-align:left| Hammer throw
|71.07
| 8 q|73.86 NR
| 4 
|-style=text-align:center
|style=text-align:left| Goldie Sayers
|style=text-align:left| Javelin throw
|58.28
|26
| colspan=2
|}

Combined events – Heptathlon

Key
Note–Ranks given for track events are within the athlete's heat only
Q = Qualified for the next round
q = Qualified for the next round as a fastest loser or'', in field events, by position without achieving the qualifying targetNR = National recordPB''' = Personal best
N/A = Round not applicable for the event
Bye = Athlete not required to compete in round

References

Sources 
British team

Nations at the 2015 World Championships in Athletics
World Championships in Athletics
Great Britain and Northern Ireland at the World Championships in Athletics